Schoolkids Records is a retail indie record store based in the "Triangle" region of Raleigh-Durham-Chapel Hill, North Carolina.

Founded in 1974, Schoolkids is one of the longest-running music retail stores in the country and at one point had seven stores throughout the eastern North Carolina region (Raleigh (2), Durham, Chapel Hill, Cary, Greenville). As of 2009 the main flagship store in Raleigh, NC (Across from NC State University) was the sole location still in business.  In October 2013, the store announced it would relocate to the Mission Valley Shopping Center to make way for a destination hotel that was causing the eviction of several local businesses along Hillsborough Street. The new location would still allow the business to operate close to the university, while expanding space for live music performances and the ability to sell craft beers. In 2016 Schoolkids reopened on Franklin Street in Chapel Hill, North Carolina and continues to have two locations.

The store has often been located close to College and University campus and focuses mostly on selling Alternative, Independent and College music, selling both Vinyl and CDs, with the trend largely going back to more and more vinyl by 2012.  Schoolkids has been widely known as the main record store for almost 40 years (until the other locations closed) around schools such as: North Carolina State University, The University of North Carolina, Duke University, East Carolina University, The University of Georgia, University of Tennessee, Indiana University, Ohio State University, Miami University, Virginia Tech, University of Michigan, and Michigan State University.

The store has often been the destination and shopping preference for many local and national bands in this area, many of whom either worked at the store or started selling their first albums or 7" singles at the store on consignment.  Artists to get their start selling records at Schoolkids include: Ryan Adams and Whiskeytown, Superchunk, Archers of Loaf, Ben Folds, The Connells, Polvo, Athenaeum, Squirrel Nut Zippers and many others.  The store was also one of the first retail outlets to sell No Depression Magazine and to work with labels such as Merge Records, Mammoth Records and Yep Roc Records.

The store saw its highest level of sales in the early 1990s when the independent music sector exploded with the success of Nirvana.

Schoolkids has often been confused with some of the other stores in the country with the same name, including "Schoolkids Records" and "Schoolkids in Exile" in Ann Arbor, Michigan as well as other cities like Gainesville, Florida, but the stores were not connected in ownership to the main independent chain in North Carolina.
 
Schoolkids is a founding members of the CIMS Coalition, The first national Coalition of Independent Music Stores and has also been named by both Time Magazine and The Grammys as one of the "top ten" record stores in the United States.

In 2014, in their new location at the Mission Valley Shopping Center (just on the south side of NC State's main campus), Schoolkids obtained an ABC license and started serving craft beers on draft and cans to their customers. The store increased its instore performances from national and local bands and became a store by day and a lounge-style bar/venue by night. Shows end early (generally start at 8pm) and are over by 10pm. All shows are free and the store encourages customers to tip the band in a 'pass the Devo energy dome' event each night.

For Record Store Day 2014, Schoolkids had the best sales day in its 40-year history. That July, they hosted a 40th Anniversary show for free at the Lincoln Theatre. The lineup included The DeBonzo Brothers, Hank Sinatra, Six String Drag, The Baseball Project, and Drivin' n' Cryin'. The show drew close to 700 people for the 5–6 hour event. The store also saw John Densmore of The Doors visit for a book signing in September that drew over 300 fans. At year end, Schoolkids had seen its first growth year in almost 10 years with Vinyl sales now 70% of the business, with a growth of 57% from 2013-2014.

References

1974 establishments in North Carolina
Companies based in Raleigh, North Carolina
Retail companies established in 1974
Music retailers of the United States